James Barker may refer to:

 James Barker (athlete) (1892–1947), British track and field athlete
 James Barker (judge) (1839–1905), Justice of the Massachusetts Supreme Judicial Court
 James Barker (Royal Navy officer) (1772–1838), captain in the Royal Navy
 James Barker (priest) (1667–1736), English priest, Archdeacon of Chichester
 James Barker (Rhode Island official) (1622–1702), British deputy governor of the Colony of Rhode Island and Providence Plantations
 James Barker in James Barker Band, Canadian country musician
 James A. Barker (1857–1943), Wisconsin State Senator
 James Edward Barker (born 1980), British composer, music producer and film producer
 James Francis Barker (1872–1950), American academic; second president of the Rochester Athenæum and Mechanics Institute
 James Frazier Barker (born 1947), former president of Clemson University
 James L. Barker (1880–1955), American linguist and historian
 James Madison Barker (1886–1974), American banker and business executive
 James Nelson Barker (1784–1858), American soldier, playwright, mayor of Philadelphia
 James P. Barker, American soldier convicted of rape and the murder of an Iraqi family
 James R. Barker (academic) (fl. 2000s–2010s), professor of organizational theory and strategy
 James R. Barker (businessman) (fl. 1950s–2000s), shipping executive
 James Rollins Barker (fl. 1940s–1980s), Canadian diplomat
 Jim Barker (born 1956), American gridiron football coach
 Jim Barker (politician) (1935–2005), Democratic politician from the U.S. state of Oklahoma
 James R. Barker (1976 ship)

See also
 James Barker Edmonds (1832–1900), president of the board of commissioners for the District of Columbia